This is a comprehensive listing of the current and former members of KMFDM, an industrial band formed by Sascha Konietzko in 1984. KMFDM existed from 1984 until they broke up in 1999. The band reformed in 2002. Konietzko has been the only permanent member throughout the band's history. Individuals that simultaneously  played live and contributed in the studio were regarded as official members, as also indicated by promotional material or liner notes. In addition, numerous individuals had only performed live while others had only appeared on studio material; thus, both instances were not treated in an official capacity.

Current members 
Sascha Konietzko – vocals, guitars, bass, programming, keyboards, synthesizer, percussion, production, engineering, mixing (1984–present)
Lucia Cifarelli – vocals, keyboards (2002–present)
Andy Selway – drums (2002–present)
Andee Blacksugar – guitars (2017–present)

Former members 
Raymond Watts – vocals, programming (1984–1988, 1994–1995, 1997, 2002–2004, guest 2019)
En Esch – vocals, drums, guitars, programming (1985–1999)
Rudolph Naomi – drums (1985–1986, 1989–1991)
Günter Schulz – guitars, programming (1989–1999)
Mark Durante – guitars (touring 1989, guest 1990, 1992–1997)
Bill Rieflin – drums, programming, percussion, bass (guest 1990, 1995–1999, 2002–2003, guest 2011)
Tim Sköld – vocals, guitars, bass, drums, programming (1997–1999, 2002, 2009)
Jules Hodgson – guitars, bass, keyboards (2002–2016, guest 2022)
Steve White – guitars (touring 2002–2003, 2003–2015)

Additional touring members 
Udo Sturm – multimedia (1984)
Chris Vrenna – drums (1992)
Cole Coonce – guitars (1992)
Chrissie DeWinter – vocals (1992)
Jennifer Ginsberg – vocals (guest 1994, 1995–1996)
Mike Jensen – guitars (1995)
John DeSalvo – drums (1997)
Nivek Ogre – vocals (1997, guest 1999)

Studio guest appearances 

Ton Geist – guitars (1984)
Jr. Blackmail – vocals (1987, 1988, 1996)
Sigrid Meyer – vocals (1989)
Morgan Adjei – vocals (1989)
Christine Siewert – vocals (1990, 1992, 1993)
Johann Bley – drums (1990)
Paul Barker – bass (1990)
William Tucker – guitars (1990)
Dorona Alberti – vocals (1992–1996, 2002)
Chris Randall – production, programming (1992)
Chris Shepard – production, programming (1993–1999, 2002–2003, 2009)
Bruce Breckenfeld – Hammond B3 organ (1993, 1996, 2022)
Jim Christiansen – trombone (1995)
Jeff Olson – trumpet (1995)
Fritz Whitney – bari sax (1995)
Bruce Bendinger – voice (1996)

Nicole Blackman – vocals (1996)
Michael Cichowicz – trumpet (1996)
Chris Connelly – vocals (1996, 2002)
F.M. Einheit – production, noises, percussion (1989, 1996)
Steve Finkel – saxophone (1996)
Jack Kramer – trumpet (1996)
Ron Lowe – drill and vacuum cleaner (1996)
Bob Samborski – trombone (1996)
Jon Van Eaton – noise (1996)
Cheryl Wilson – vocals (1996, 1999, 2003, 2009, 2019)
Abby Travis – vocals, bass (1997)
Michel Bassin – guitars, percussion (1997)
Amy Denio – saxophone, alto saxophone (1997, 2007)
Frank Chotai – programming (1999)
Paul de Carli – digital editing (1999)
Nina Hagen – vocals (1999)

Arianne Schreiber – vocals (2002)
Curt Golden – slide guitar (2002, 2003)
Mona Mur – vocals (2003)
Mina Stolle – trumpet (2005)
Jin Kninja – trumpet (2007)
Anna Koudriachova – count-up (2009)
William Wilson – vocals (2010, 2011)
Free Dominguez – vocals (2011)
Che Eckert – news speak (2011)
Koichi Fukuda – guitars (2011)
Sebastian Komor – drum programming, synth production (2011)
Sin Quirin – guitars (2017)
Doug Wimbish – bass (2017, 2019)
Chris Harms – guitars (2017)
Andrew Lindsley – vocals (2019, 2022)
Sissy Misfit – vocals (2022)

Timeline

References

KMFDM